

The Astronomische Gesellschaft is an astronomical society established in 1863 in Heidelberg, the second oldest astronomical society after the Royal Astronomical Society.

In 1882, the Astronomische Gesellschaft founded the Central Bureau for Astronomical Telegrams at Kiel, where it remained until during World War I when it was moved to the Østervold Observatory at Copenhagen, Denmark, to be operated there by the Copenhagen University Observatory.

Around the turn of the 20th century the A.G. initiated the most important star catalog of this time, the Astronomische Gesellschaft Katalog (AGK).

The assembly in Danzig (now Gdańsk) in August 1939 was the last until a meeting at Göttingen in 1947, when it was re-commenced as Astronomische Gesellschaft in der Britischen Zone.  The post-war editorial board consisted of Chairman Albrecht Unsöld (Kiel), Otto Heckmann, J. Larink, B. Straßl, Paul ten Bruggencate, and also Max Beyer representing the amateurs of the society.

Presidents
 1863–1864: Julius Zech
 1864–1867: Friedrich Wilhelm Argelander
 1867–1878: Otto Wilhelm von Struve
 1878–1881: Adalbert Krueger
 1881–1889: Arthur Auwers
 1889–1896: Hugo Gyldén
 1896–1921: Hugo von Seeliger
 1921–1930: Svante Elis Strömgren
 1930–1932: Max Wolf
 1932–1939: Hans Ludendorff
 1939–1945: August Kopff
 1945–1947: vacant
 1947–1949: Albrecht Unsöld
 1949–1952: Friedrich Becker
 1952–1957: Otto Heckmann
 1957–1960: Paul ten Bruggencate
 1960–1966: Hans Haffner
 1966–1969: Rudolf Kippenhahn
 1969–1972: Walter Fricke
 1972–1975: Hans-Heinrich Voigt
 1975–1978: Wolfgang Priester
 1978–1981: Theodor Schmidt-Kaler
 1981–1984: Gustav Andreas Tammann
 1984–1987: Michael Grewing
 1987–1990: Egon Horst Schröter
 1990–1993: Wolfgang Hillebrandt
 1993–1996: Hanns Ruder
 1996–1999: Werner Pfau
 1999–2002: Erwin Sedlmayr
 2002–2005: Joachim Krautter
 2005–2008: Gerhard Hensler
 2008–2011: Ralf-Jürgen Dettmar
 2011–2014: Andreas Burkert
 2014–2017: Matthias Steinmetz
 2017–2020: Joachim Wambsganß
 since 2020: Michael Kramer

Honorary members 
With dates of appointment:
 Albrecht Unsöld (1989)
 Wilhelm Becker (1992)
 Erich Kirste (1992)
 Martin Schwarzschild (1993)
 Reimar Lüst (1998)
 Hans-Heinrich Voigt (2007)
 Klaus Tschira (2011)
 Rudolf Kippenhahn (2016)

Awards 

The astronomical society awards the following awards and prizes:
 Karl Schwarzschild Medal
 Ludwig Biermann Förderpreis (:de:Ludwig-Biermann-Förderpreis)
 Bruno H. Bürgel Award
 Hans Ludwig Neumann Award (:de:Hans-Ludwig-Neumann-Preis)

The Hanno and Ruth Roelin Prize is also awarded at the society's annual meeting, but it is administered by the Max Planck Institute for Astronomy.

See also 
 Astronomical Calculation Institute (University of Heidelberg)
 Vereinigte Astronomische Gesellschaft
 List of astronomical societies

References

Further reading 
 Schmeidler, F.  1988, Die Geschichte der Astronomischen Gesellschaft, Jubiläumsband - 135 Jahre Astronomische Gesellschaft, Astron. Ges. Hamburg, vi + 70pp.
 Internationality from the VAG (1800) to the Astronomische Gesellschaft.

External links 
 

Astronomy organizations
Astronomy in Germany
Scientific organisations based in Germany
1863 establishments in Baden
Scientific organizations established in 1863
Heidelberg